Lakshmi Narasimha Entertainments (Telugu: లక్ష్మీ నరసింహ ఎంటర్‌టైన్‌మెంట్) is an Indian film production company established by Chakri Chigurupati an Indian film producer. The company is based in Hyderabad.Telugu movies produced by the company Veedu Theda, Swamy Ra Ra, Mosagallaku Mosagadu (2015 film), C/o Surya and Okka Kshanam .

Production company and success
Chakri Chigurupati established Lakshmi Narasimha Entertainments in 2011. The first movie that was made under the banner was Veedu Theda directed by Chinni Krishna. In 2013, they made Swamy Ra Ra under the direction of Sudheer Varma. In 2015, they made Mosagallaku Mosagadu (2015 film) under the direction of Nellore Bose. In 2017 they produced two films C/o Surya under the direction of Suseenthiran and Okka Kshanam under the direction of Vi Anand.

Film Production

References

External links
 

Indian film studios
Film production companies based in Hyderabad, India
2011 establishments in Andhra Pradesh
Indian companies established in 2011